Al-Na'im (also spelled al-Naeem) is a village in central Syria, administratively part of the Homs Governorate, located southwest of Homs and northwest of al-Qusayr. Just east of the border with Lebanon and on the western shores of Lake Qattinah, nearby localities include al-Aqrabiyah to the south, Tell al-Nabi Mando, Arjoun, al-Houz to the southeast, Kafr Mousa and al-Ghassaniyah to the east, Khirbet Ghazi to the northeast and Wujuh al-Hajar and Liftaya to the north. According to the Syria Central Bureau of Statistics (CBS), al-Na'im had a population of 2,290 in the 2004 census.

References

Populated places in al-Qusayr District